The Broadcasting Press Guild (BPG) is a British association of journalists dedicated to the topic of general media issues.

History
The Guild was established in 1974 as a breakaway of The Critics' Circle. Currently it groups over 100 staff and freelance journalists dedicated to covering most major national newspapers and trade journals. One of the Guild's most recognized activities is the hosting of luncheons where leading industry figures are engaged in dialogue.

The Guild has entertained every director-general and every chairman of the BBC except one, as well as every government minister responsible for broadcasting and a wide range of top executives from all TV and radio channels in the country. Previous lunch speakers include Sally Wainwright, Peter Fincham, David Abraham, John Whittingdale, Chris Patten, Jeremy Hunt and Greg Dyke.

Awards
 BPG TV & Radio awards — Awarded since 1974 to recognize outstanding programs and performances in British television and radio. The awards ceremony is considered an important media event in Britain, and since 2010 they have been sponsored by Dave
 Harvey Lee Award for Outstanding Contribution to Broadcasting — Awarded since 1992 and named after the British journalist Harvey Lee, who was also Secretary and Chairman of the BPG. Recipients include Sir Terry Wogan and Sir Denis Forman
 BPG Innovation Award — Awarded since 2006, given in recognition of "original thinking across programming, production and technology."

In the news
It is common for major media announcements or changes in policy to be made at the BPG's luncheons. In 2012, Richard Klein, the BBC Four Controller, announced the network would be pulling broadcasts of Top of the Pops re-runs in the wake of the Jimmy Savile scandal. At the same event, Klein announced that the network had purchased the broadcast rights for the NBC comedy series Parks and Recreation.

In a 2012 luncheon, Lord Patten announced that some BBC freelancers, including Fiona Bruce and Graham Norton, would be offered staff contracts following a review of the BBC's tax arrangements, while at the same time denying that the broadcaster had engaged in tax dodging. During the same event, Patten also broke his silence about the Jimmy Savile scandal, clarifying widespread allegations of a corporate cover-up.

References

External links
 

1974 establishments in the United Kingdom
United Kingdom journalism organisations
Organizations established in 1974
Business organisations based in London